Giovanni di Niccolò Mansueti (also known as Giovanni Mansueti;  c. 1465 – March 26, 1527) was an Italian painter.

Little is known of his biography. He was active in Venice from 1485 to 1526. A pupil of Gentile Bellini, he worked in the antique style in the Miracles of the Cross painted around 1496-1502 for the Scuola Grande di San Giovanni Evangelista and now in  the Gallerie dell'Accademia. In style he resembles Cima da Conegliano and Vittore Carpaccio.  One of his paintings resides in a church near Bagni di Lucca, Italy.

Sources
 Links to other Mansueti Biographies and images of works at ArtCyclopedia.com
Giovanni Mansueti on Artcyclopedia

1465 births
16th-century deaths
Painters from Venice
15th-century Italian painters
Italian male painters
16th-century Italian painters
Italian Renaissance painters